Major General Barrington Bulkeley Campbell, 3rd Baron Blythswood,  (18 February 1845 – 13 March 1918) was a British Army officer.

Military career
Born the son of Archibald Campbell, 17th Laird of Mains, Barrington Campbell became a lieutenant in the Lanarkshire Yeomanry Cavalry on 15 October 1867. He served with the 1st Battalion Scots Guards during the Anglo-Egyptian War in Egypt in 1882, and was present in the engagement at El Magyar and Tel-el-Mahuta, and the Battle of Tell El Kebir (13 September 1882). He was awarded the Royal Humane Society Medal in 1889 for saving a life. He was promoted to Major-General in 1898. Following the outbreak of the Second Boer War in late 1899, he was in early 1900 appointed in command of the 16th Infantry Brigade sent to serve in South Africa as part of the 8th Division under Sir Leslie Rundle. He left Southampton for South Africa on the SS Britannic in March 1900. For his service in the war he was twice mentioned in despatches (including by Lord Kitchener dated 23 June 1902), and appointed a Companion of the Order of the Bath (CB).

Following his return to the United Kingdom, he served as Lieutenant-Governor and Commander-in-Chief of Guernsey from 1903 to 1908.

In 1908, his name was legally changed to Barrington Bulkley Douglas Campbell-Douglas. On 24 August 1910, he was appointed a deputy lieutenant of Lanarkshire. On 30 September 1916, he changed his name back to Barrington Bulkeley Douglas Campbell when he succeeded his brother, Reverend Sholto as Baron Blythswood. He inherited Blythswood in the County of Renfrewshire at that time.

He was succeeded by his son, Brig.-Maj. Archibald Campbell who became 4th Baron Blythswood and who had also, in 1916, legally changed his name to Campbell-Douglas.

Honours
Douglas-Campbell was appointed a Commander of the Royal Victorian Order (CVO) on 2 May 1902.

References 

|-

|-

1845 births
1918 deaths
3
British Army major generals
Commanders of the Royal Victorian Order
Knights Commander of the Order of the Bath
Lanarkshire Yeomanry officers
British Army personnel of the Anglo-Egyptian War
Deputy Lieutenants of Lanarkshire